Lady Elizabeth was a British ship built in 1869 by Robert Thompson Jr. of Sunderland. Robert Thompson Jr. was one of the sons of Robert Thompson Sr. who owned and operated the family ran shipyard J. L. Thompson & Sons. Thompson Jr. eventually left the family business in 1854 to start his own shipbuilding business in Southwick, Sunderland. She was 658 tons and was classified as a barque cargo sailing ship with one deck and three masts. She had a keel and outer planking made from American rock elm and a fore end made from English elm. The stem was made of teak and English oak with an iron floor as the deck. The ship also had copper and iron fastings. The ships was also registered in London under the name Wilson & Co. Messrs Wilson & Co. was based out of Sydney, Australia. The ship carried a comparative classification under American Lloyd's as "First class-third grade" (First Class under British Lloyd's)

Service history

Lady Elizabeth was owned by shipping merchant John Wilson and made her primary shipping runs between Fremantle, Western Australia and London. Sometimes Lady Elizabeth would make other runs to Chinese ports in the Asian Indian region to deliver timber. There is speculation that Lady Elizabeth was named after John Wilsons mother Elizabeth Wilson. She was commanded by Captain Edward W. Cobbett and after 1875, by Captain Thomas S. Scott.

Final years

Lady Elizabeth was only in service for nine years when she met her fate on 30 June 1878, while she was on charter for Messrs Shenton and Monger to carry a cargo of lead ore and 611 tons of sandalwood to Shanghai. Captain Scott encountered rough weather around Rottnest Island and the ship was driven south because of the difficulties in acquiring navigational headings. On the morning of 30 June, Captain Scott ordered the crew to head back to Fremantle about 55 kilometres away to south-south-east. During the heavy storm, one man was lost overboard but the crew could not launch any boats to rescue the sailor because of the weather.

Captain Scott sighted what he believed to be Parker Point (the southernmost tip of Rottnest Island) and ordered his crew to adjust the ship's heading towards Fremantle through Rottnest Island's southern channel. Moments later, Lady Elizabeth struck a reef in Bickley Bay. The ship lost control and swung to the south when Captain Scott ordered the port anchor be dropped. At 10:30 pm, Lady Elizabeth began listing to starboard and the water started coming over the decks. Captain Nash, a pilot on Rottnest Island saw the blue distress signal flares but was unable to reach Lady Elizabeth due to the weather. He was forced to wait out the storm. By morning, weather conditions improved to launch a rescue of Lady Elizabeth's crew. Over the course of the next few months, the sandalwood that was stored in the ship's cargo hold broke free and washed up on shore. Most of the cargo was scattered between Rottnest Island and Bunbury.

Nearby locals made substantial gains salvaging the cargo from the lost Lady Elizabeth. It is believed that the sailor who was lost overboard during the storm was the only casualty.

Outcome

An inquiry into the disaster found that Captain Scott was not liable for the sinking and no charges against him were filed. However, during the inquiry, it was noted that Captain Scott 'made use of expressions which were both unbecoming and amounted to gross contempt'. Afterwards, he displayed regret for the use of his expressions and apologized to the Court. The court inquiry was held by L. Worsley Clifton, Collector of Customs; John F. Stone, J.P.; and W. E. Archdeacon, Staff Commander, R.N., Admiralty Surveyor. Captain Thomas Scott retained his certificate of captain.

The hull, iron ore, and sandalwood that were salvaged was sold at auction for £1,039. The sandalwood that was lost was insured for £5,000.

After the sinking of Lady Elizabeth, Robert Thompson & Sons of Sunderland under J.L. Thompson and Sons company, began construction of another Lady Elizabeth, completed in 1879, just one year after the sinking of the first Lady Elizabeth.

Other events

Shortly after the sinking of Lady Elizabeth, Ah Cum, a Chinese steward, was charged with larceny. Ah Cum did plead guilty to stealing personal effects and cargo from Captain Scott. The items included one pound of corn flour, a pound of tea, two dozen red herrings, two bottles of brandy, two bottle of wine, a pint of rum, two cans of jam, and tobacco. Ah Cum had apparently sold the merchandise to other immigrants sailing on Lady Elizabeth. He was sentenced to 3 years gaol.

Two more immigrants were also charged with larceny on the last voyage of Lady Elizabeth. Robert Young & George Lench both pleaded guilty and were sentenced to ten months in prison. The two immigrants were later acquitted.

Two more immigrants were taken into custody for breaching the cargo when they arrived in Fremantle on 12 March 1878. Their outcome is not determined.

Documented arrival and departures

Meaning of column A or D (For Arriving or Departing):
A Arriving
D Departing
S Last spotted

Current status

Lady Elizabeth was discovered in 1969 in 7 metres of water on Porpoise Bay near Rottnest Island and Dyer Island. The bell from Lady Elizabeth was raised and donated to the Western Australian Maritime Museum where it is currently displayed. The wreck has become a common site for divers to view the wreck however; no artifacts can be removed under the Historic Shipwrecks Act 1976.

Notes and other information

 According to the Western Australian Maritime Museum, There was another three-masted barque named Lady Elizabeth that visited Fremantle, Western Australia that was built in Sunderland England in 1852. (Official ID: 25973) That ship was built for C. Tyler who also registered the ship in London. Although they are similar in design, there is no relation between this ship and Lady Elizabeth (1869) & (1879).
 After stepping down as captain of Lady Elizabeth, Cobbett eventually became captain of the steamer Saxon Monarch under the British flag in 1880.

See also

Rottnest Island shipwrecks

References

Barques
Shipwrecks of Western Australia
Maritime incidents in June 1878
Rottnest Island
1869 ships